Gelechia allotria is a moth of the family Gelechiidae. It is found in North Africa, where it has only been recorded from Algeria.

The wingspan is about 11 mm. The forewings are grey and the hindwings brown.

References

Moths described in 1925
Gelechia